Zhong Mengying (born 14 March 1990) is a Chinese triathlete. She won the silver medal in the women's triathlon at the 2018 Asian Games in Jakarta, Indonesia. She competed in the women's event at the 2020 Summer Olympics held in Tokyo, Japan.

References

External links
 

1990 births
Living people
Chinese female triathletes
Asian Games medalists in triathlon
Triathletes at the 2018 Asian Games
Asian Games silver medalists for Japan
Medalists at the 2018 Asian Games
Olympic triathletes of China
Triathletes at the 2020 Summer Olympics
Place of birth missing (living people)
20th-century Chinese women
21st-century Chinese women